Herman van Doorn (born 1963) is a Dutch singer also known as "Hermanherman". He is known for singing the Dutch theme songs for the long running animated series Pokémon.

Biography

Van Doorn studied at the Conservatory of Utrecht and Berklee College in Boston, with the emphasis to jazz vocals and improvisation. His styles widely range from improvised music and modern composed music, to pop and musical theatre. His most famous work is performing the Dutch theme songs for the television series Pokémon.

Discography

Albums 
 1999: "For What You Are Is Never Seen"
 2001: "Movin"
 2010: "Fugain" 
 2017: "1418"

Singles 
 2010: "Le Printemps" (From the album: "Fugain")
 2010: "Attention Mesdames Et Messieurs" (From the album: "Fugain")
 2011: "Fête Foraine" 
 2014: "For The Fallen" (From the album: "1418")

References 

1963 births
Living people
Dutch pop singers
Dutch jazz singers